The 2015–16 network television schedule for the five major English-language commercial broadcast networks in the United States covers prime time hours from September 1, 2015 to August 31, 2016. The schedule is followed by a list per network of returning series, new series, and series canceled after the 2014–15 season.

NBC was the first to announce its fall schedule on May 10, 2015, followed by Fox on May 11, ABC on May 12, CBS on May 13, and The CW on May 14.

PBS is not included; member stations have local flexibility over most of their schedules and broadcast times for network shows may vary. Ion Television and MyNetworkTV are also not included since the majority of both networks' schedules comprise syndicated reruns (with limited original programming on the former). The CW is not included on weekends, since it does not offer network programming.

New series are highlighted in bold.

All times are U.S. Eastern and Pacific time (except for some live sports or events). Subtract one hour for Central and Mountain times.

Note: From August 5 to August 21, 2016, all NBC primetime programming was pre-empted for coverage of the 2016 Summer Olympics in Rio de Janeiro, Brazil.

Each of the 30 highest-rated shows is listed with its rank and rating as determined by Nielsen Media Research.

Legend

Sunday

Monday

Tuesday

Note: Heartbeat, then known as Heartbreaker, was originally scheduled to air at 9:00 PM on NBC.

Wednesday

Thursday

Friday

Saturday

By network

ABC

Returning series:
20/20
20/20: In an Instant
500 Questions
ABC Saturday Movie of the Week
Agent Carter
Agents of S.H.I.E.L.D.
America's Funniest Home Videos
American Crime
The Bachelor
Bachelor in Paradise
The Bachelorette
BattleBots
Beyond the Tank
Black-ish
Boston EMS
Castle
Celebrity Family Feud
Dancing with the Stars
Fresh Off the Boat
Galavant
The Goldbergs
The Great Christmas Light Fight
Grey's Anatomy
How to Get Away with Murder
Last Man Standing
The Middle
Mistresses
Modern Family
Nashville
Once Upon a Time
Scandal
Secrets and Lies
Shark Tank

New series:
The $100,000 Pyramid *
Blood & Oil
The Catch *
Dr. Ken
The Family *
The Great Holiday Baking Show
Greatest Hits *
Madoff *
Match Game *
The Muppets
My Diet Is Better Than Yours *
NBA Saturday Primetime on ABC *
Of Kings and Prophets *
People's List *
Quantico
The Real O'Neals *
To Tell the Truth *
Uncle Buck *
Wicked City

Not returning from 2014–15:
The Astronaut Wives Club
Cristela
Forever
Manhattan Love Story
Repeat After Me
Resurrection
Revenge
Rookie Blue
Selfie
The Taste
The Whispers

CBS

Returning series:
2 Broke Girls
48 Hours
60 Minutes
The Amazing Race
The Big Bang Theory
Big Brother
Blue Bloods
Criminal Minds
CSI: Crime Scene Investigation
CSI: Cyber
Elementary
The Good Wife
Hawaii Five-0
Madam Secretary
Mike & Molly
Mom
NCIS
NCIS: Los Angeles
NCIS: New Orleans
The Odd Couple
Person of Interest
Scorpion
Survivor
Thursday Night Football
Undercover Boss
Zoo

New series:
American Gothic *
Angel from Hell *
BrainDead *
Code Black
Criminal Minds: Beyond Borders *
Life in Pieces
Limitless
Rush Hour *
Supergirl

Not returning from 2014–15:
Battle Creek
The Briefcase
Extant
The McCarthys
The Mentalist
The Millers
Stalker
Two and a Half Men
Under the Dome

The CW

Returning series:
The 100
America's Next Top Model
Arrow
Beauty & the Beast
The Flash
iZombie
Jane the Virgin
Mad TV (moved from Fox)
The Originals
Penn & Teller: Fool Us
Reign
Supernatural
The Vampire Diaries
Whose Line Is It Anyway?

New series:
Containment *
Crazy Ex-Girlfriend
Legends of Tomorrow *

Not returning from 2014–15:
Hart of Dixie
The Messengers
Significant Mother

Fox

Returning series:
American Idol
Bob's Burgers
Bones
Brooklyn Nine-Nine
Empire
Family Guy
Fox College Football
Gotham
Hell's Kitchen
Home Free
The Last Man on Earth
MasterChef
MasterChef Junior
New Girl
NFL on Fox
The Simpsons
Sleepy Hollow
Wayward Pines
World's Funniest
The X-Files

New series:
American Grit *
Bordertown *
Cooper Barrett's Guide to Surviving Life *
Coupled *
Grandfathered
The Grinder
Houdini & Doyle *
Lucifer *
Minority Report
Rosewood
Scream Queens
Second Chance *

Not returning from 2014–15:
Backstrom
The Following
 Glee
Knock Knock Live
The Mindy Project (moved to Hulu)
 Mulaney
 Red Band Society
 Utopia
 Weird Loners

NBC

Returning series:
American Ninja Warrior
America's Got Talent
Aquarius
The Biggest Loser
The Blacklist
The Carmichael Show
Caught on Camera with Nick Cannon
Chicago Fire
Chicago P.D.
Dateline NBC
Football Night in America
Grimm
Hollywood Game Night
I Can Do That
Law & Order: Special Victims Unit
The Mysteries of Laura
NBC Sunday Night Football
The Night Shift
Running Wild with Bear Grylls
Undateable
The Voice

New series:
Best Time Ever with Neil Patrick Harris
Better Late Than Never *
Blindspot
Chicago Med
Crowded *
Game of Silence *
Heartbeat *
Heroes Reborn
Little Big Shots *
Maya & Marty *
The Player
Shades of Blue *
Spartan: Ultimate Team Challenge *
Strong *
Superstore
Telenovela
Truth Be Told
You, Me and the Apocalypse *

Not returning from 2014–15:
 A to Z
A.D. The Bible Continues
About a Boy
Allegiance
American Odyssey
The Apprentice
Bad Judge
Constantine
Hannibal
Marry Me
Mr. Robinson
One Big Happy
Parenthood
 Parks and Recreation
 State of Affairs
Welcome to Sweden

Renewals and cancellations

Full season pickups

ABC
Dr. Ken—Picked up for a 22-episode full season on October 20, 2015.
Fresh Off the Boat—Picked up for a 22-episode full season on October 13, 2015. Two additional episodes were ordered on November 17, 2015, bringing the order to 24 episodes.
Quantico—Picked up for a 19-episode full season on October 13, 2015. Three additional episodes were ordered on November 6, 2015, bringing the order to 22 episodes.

CBS
Life in Pieces—Picked up for a 22-episode full season on October 27, 2015.
Limitless—Picked up for a 22-episode full season on October 23, 2015.
Supergirl—Picked up for a 20-episode full season on November 30, 2015.

The CW
Crazy Ex-Girlfriend—Picked up for an 18-episode full season on November 23, 2015.
iZombie—Picked up for a 19-episode full season on November 23, 2015.

Fox
Grandfathered—Picked up for a 22-episode full season on October 28, 2015.
The Grinder—Picked up for a 22-episode full season on October 27, 2015.
Rosewood—Picked up for a 22-episode full season on October 16, 2015.

NBC
Blindspot—Picked up for a 22-episode full season on October 9, 2015. An additional episode was ordered on November 3, 2015, bringing the order to 23 episodes.
Chicago Med—Picked up for an 18-episode full season on December 11, 2015.

Renewals

ABC
20/20—Renewed for a thirty-eighth season on May 17, 2016.
The $100,000 Pyramid—Renewed for a second season on August 4, 2016.
Agents of S.H.I.E.L.D.—Renewed for a fourth season on March 3, 2016.
American Crime—Renewed for a third season on May 12, 2016.
America's Funniest Home Videos—Renewed for a twenty-seventh season on March 3, 2016.
The Bachelor—Renewed for a twenty-first season on March 3, 2016.
Bachelor in Paradise—Renewed for a fourth season on September 6, 2016.
Black-ish—Renewed for a third season on March 3, 2016.
The Catch—Renewed for a second season on May 12, 2016.
Celebrity Family Feud—Renewed for a third season on August 4, 2016.
Dancing with the Stars—Renewed for a twenty-third season on March 3, 2016.
Dr. Ken—Renewed for a second season on May 12, 2016.
Fresh Off the Boat—Renewed for a third season on March 3, 2016.
The Goldbergs—Renewed for a fourth season on March 3, 2016.
Grey's Anatomy—Renewed for a thirteenth season on March 3, 2016.
How to Get Away with Murder—Renewed for a third season on March 3, 2016.
Last Man Standing—Renewed for a sixth season on May 13, 2016.
Match Game—Renewed for a second season on August 4, 2016.
The Middle—Renewed for an eighth season on March 3, 2016.
Modern Family—Renewed for an eighth season on March 3, 2016.
Once Upon a Time—Renewed for a sixth season on March 3, 2016.
Quantico—Renewed for a second season on March 3, 2016.
The Real O'Neals—Renewed for a second season on May 12, 2016.
Scandal—Renewed for a sixth season on March 3, 2016.
Shark Tank—Renewed for an eighth season on March 3, 2016.
To Tell the Truth—Renewed for a second season on August 4, 2016.

CBS
2 Broke Girls—Renewed for a sixth season on March 25, 2016.
48 Hours—Renewed for a twenty-ninth season on May 18, 2016.
60 Minutes—Renewed for a forty-ninth season on May 18, 2016.
The Amazing Race—Renewed for a twenty-ninth season on March 25, 2016.
The Big Bang Theory—Renewed for a tenth season on March 12, 2014.
Big Brother—Renewed for a nineteenth and twentieth season on August 10, 2016.
Blue Bloods—Renewed for a seventh season on March 25, 2016.
Code Black—Renewed for a second season on May 16, 2016.
Criminal Minds—Renewed for a twelfth season on May 6, 2016.
Criminal Minds: Beyond Borders— Renewed for a second season on May 16, 2016.
Elementary—Renewed for a fifth season on March 25, 2016.
Hawaii Five-0—Renewed for a seventh season on March 25, 2016.
Life in Pieces—Renewed for a second season on May 11, 2016.
Madam Secretary—Renewed for a third season on March 25, 2016.
Mom—Renewed for a fourth season on March 25, 2016.
NCIS—Renewed for a fourteenth season on February 29, 2016.
NCIS: Los Angeles—Renewed for an eighth season on March 25, 2016.
NCIS: New Orleans—Renewed for a third season on March 25, 2016.
The Odd Couple—Renewed for a third season on May 16, 2016.
Scorpion—Renewed for a third season on March 25, 2016.
Supergirl—Renewed for a second season on May 12, 2016 and will be moved to The CW.
Survivor—Renewed for a thirty-third season on March 25, 2016.
Undercover Boss —Renewed for an eighth season on May 16, 2016.
Zoo—Renewed for a third season on August 10, 2016.

The CW
 The 100—Renewed for a fourth season on March 11, 2016.
 Arrow—Renewed for a fifth season on March 11, 2016.
 Crazy Ex-Girlfriend—Renewed for a second season on March 11, 2016.
 The Flash—Renewed for a third season on March 11, 2016.
 iZombie—Renewed for a third season on March 11, 2016.
 Jane the Virgin—Renewed for a third season on March 11, 2016.
 Legends of Tomorrow—Renewed for a second season on March 11, 2016.
 The Originals—Renewed for a fourth season on March 11, 2016.
 Reign—Renewed for a fourth and final season on March 11, 2016.
 Supernatural—Renewed for a twelfth season on March 11, 2016.
 The Vampire Diaries—Renewed for an eighth and final season on March 11, 2016.

Fox
American Grit—Renewed for a second season on July 29, 2016.
Bob's Burgers—Renewed for a seventh season on October 7, 2015.
Bones—Renewed for a twelfth and final season on February 25, 2016.
Brooklyn Nine-Nine—Renewed for a fourth season on March 24, 2016.
Empire—Renewed for a third season on January 15, 2016.
Family Guy—Renewed for a fifteenth season on May 4, 2016.
Gotham—Renewed for a third season on March 16, 2016.
The Last Man on Earth—Renewed for a third season on March 24, 2016.
Lucifer—Renewed for a second season on April 7, 2016.
New Girl—Renewed for a sixth season on April 12, 2016.
Rosewood—Renewed for a second season on April 7, 2016.
Scream Queens—Renewed for a second season on January 15, 2016.
So You Think You Can Dance—Renewed for a fourteenth season on January 30, 2017.
Sleepy Hollow— Renewed for a fourth season on May 13, 2016.
The Simpsons—Renewed for a twenty-eighth season on May 4, 2015.

NBC
American Ninja Warrior—Renewed for a ninth season on September 12, 2016.
America's Got Talent—Renewed for a twelfth season on August 2, 2016.
Better Late Than Never—Renewed for a second season on September 22, 2016.
The Blacklist—Renewed for a fourth season on December 7, 2015.
Blindspot—Renewed for a second season on November 9, 2015.
The Carmichael Show—Renewed for a third season on May 15, 2016.
Caught on Camera with Nick Cannon—Renewed for a third season on May 15, 2016.
Chicago Fire—Renewed for a fifth season on November 9, 2015.
Chicago Med—Renewed for a second season on February 1, 2016.
Chicago P.D.—Renewed for a fourth season on November 9, 2015.
Football Night in America—Renewed for an eleventh season on December 14, 2011.
Grimm—Renewed for a sixth and final season on April 5, 2016.
Hollywood Game Night—Renewed for a fifth season on May 15, 2016.
Law & Order: Special Victims Unit—Renewed for an eighteenth season on February 1, 2016.
Little Big Shots—Renewed for a second season on March 14, 2016.
NBC Sunday Night Football—Renewed for an eleventh season on December 14, 2011.
The Night Shift—Renewed for a fourth season on November 17, 2016.
Shades of Blue—Renewed for a second season on February 5, 2016.
Spartan: Ultimate Team Challenge—Renewed for a second season on March 17, 2017.
Superstore—Renewed for a second season on February 23, 2016.
The Voice—Renewed for an eleventh season on March 25, 2016.

Cancellations/Series endings

ABC
Agent Carter—Canceled on May 12, 2016 after two seasons.
Blood & Oil—Canceled on May 12, 2016.
Castle—Canceled on May 12, 2016 after eight seasons.
The Family—Canceled on May 12, 2016.
Galavant—Canceled on May 12, 2016 after two seasons.
Mistresses—Canceled on September 9, 2016 after four seasons.
The Muppets—Canceled on May 12, 2016.
Nashville—Canceled on May 12, 2016 after four seasons. On June 9, 2016, it was announced that CMT would pick up the series for another season.
Of Kings and Prophets—Canceled on March 17, 2016 after two episodes.
Uncle Buck—Canceled on July 6, 2016.
Wicked City—Canceled on November 13, 2015 after three episodes; aired full original run of episodes with remaining five carried on network website and Hulu. This was the first official cancellation of the season.

CBS
American Gothic—Canceled on October 17, 2016.
Angel from Hell—Canceled and pulled from the schedule on February 8, 2016 after five episodes. The remaining episodes  burned off beginning July 2, 2016.
BrainDead—Canceled on October 17, 2016.
CSI: Crime Scene Investigation—It was announced on May 13, 2015 that season fifteen would be the final season. The series concluded on September 27, 2015.
CSI: Cyber—Canceled on May 12, 2016 after two seasons.
The Good Wife—It was announced on February 7, 2016 that season seven would be the final season. The series concluded on May 8, 2016.
Limitless—Canceled on May 25, 2016.
Mike & Molly—It was announced on January 12, 2016 that season six would be the final season. The series concluded on May 16, 2016.
Person of Interest—It was announced on March 16, 2016 that season five would be the final season. The series concluded on June 21, 2016.
Rush Hour—Canceled on May 16, 2016. The remaining episodes were burned off starting on July 23, 2016.

The CW
America's Next Top Model—It was announced on October 14, 2015 that season 22 would be the final season. The series concluded on December 4, 2015. On February 23, 2016, it was announced that VH1 picked up the series for a new season.
Beauty & the Beast—It was announced on October 13, 2015 that season four would be the final season. The series concluded on September 15, 2016.
Containment—Canceled on May 12, 2016.

Fox
American Idol—It was announced on May 11, 2015 that season fifteen would be the final season. The series concluded on April 7, 2016. On May 9, 2017, it was announced ABC would revive for its sixteenth season.
Bordertown—Canceled on May 12, 2016.
Cooper Barrett's Guide to Surviving Life—Canceled on May 12, 2016.
Coupled—Canceled on August 8, 2016.
Grandfathered—Canceled on May 12, 2016.
The Grinder—Canceled on May 12, 2016.
Houdini and Doyle—Canceled on August 3, 2016.
Minority Report—Canceled on May 13, 2016.
Second Chance—Canceled on May 12, 2016.

NBC
Aquarius—Canceled on October 1, 2016 after two seasons.
Best Time Ever with Neil Patrick Harris—Canceled on December 15, 2015.
Coach—It was announced on August 31, 2015 that production would not go forward, despite being previously ordered thirteen episodes, bypassing the pilot process, and already filming a single episode.
Crowded—Canceled on May 13, 2016.
Game of Silence—Canceled on May 13, 2016.
Heartbeat—Canceled on May 13, 2016.
Heroes Reborn—Canceled on January 13, 2016.
The Mysteries of Laura—Canceled on May 14, 2016 after two seasons.
The Player—Canceled on November 19, 2015.
Telenovela—Canceled on May 13, 2016.
Truth Be Told—Canceled on December 10, 2015.
Undateable—Canceled on May 13, 2016 after three seasons.
You, Me and the Apocalypse—Canceled on March 8, 2016.

See also
2015–16 Canadian network television schedule
2015–16 United States network television schedule (daytime)
2015–16 United States network television schedule (late night)

References

United States primetime network television schedules
2015 in American television
2016 in American television